Boris Kidrič (10 April 1912 – 11 April 1953) was a Slovene politician and revolutionary who was one of the chief organizers of the Slovene Partisans, the Slovene resistance against occupation by Nazi Germany and Fascist Italy after Operation Barbarossa in June 1941. He became the de facto leader of the Liberation Front of the Slovenian People. As such, he had a crucial role in the anti-Fascist liberation struggle in Slovenia between 1941 and 1945. After World War II he was, together with Edvard Kardelj, a leading Slovenian politician in communist Yugoslavia.

Life
Kidrič was born in Vienna, then capital of the Austro-Hungarian Empire, as the son of the prominent Slovene liberal literary critic France Kidrič. 

In 1953, he died of leukemia in Belgrade.

Political career
In the early 1930s, Kidrič was drafted by the communist publicist Vlado Kozak to join the Communist Party of Yugoslavia. He soon rose to high political posts in the Drava Banovina and was among the founders of the autonomous Communist Party of Slovenia in 1937. Besides Milovan Đilas and Ivan Milutinović, Kidrič was one of the major exponents of the policy of leftist errors.

After the end of World War II, the Slovenian National Liberation Council appointed him as the first president of the Slovenian socialist government and he moved into the Ebenspanger Mansion, which the communist government had confiscated from its previous Jewish owners. He became a member of the Yugoslav Politburo in 1948, and was in charge of the Yugoslav economy from 1946 until his death.

Honours and awards
He was awarded the Order of the People's Hero, Order of the Hero of Socialist Labour, Order of the People's Liberation and the Commemorative Medal of the Partisans of 1941. The National Institute of Chemistry in Ljubljana was named after him and until 1990 the main award for scientific achievements in Slovenia was called "Kidrič Prize".

Among the foreign decorations were the Soviet Union's Order of Kutuzov, 2nd class, the Hungarian Order of the Republic, the Bulgarian Order of the People's Freedom and the Polish Partisan Cross. After his death, the eastern Slovenian industrial town of Strnišče was renamed Kidričevo in his honour. In 1959, a large monument was erected in his honour in front of the Slovenian Government Office in Ljubljana, where it still stands despite some protests by anti-Communist groups and victims of Communist persecution. The Institute for Physics, near Belgrade, was renamed in his honour.

References

Sources
Janko Prunk, "Kidrič, Boris - Peter" in Enciklopedija Slovenije (Ljubljana: Mladinska knjiga, 1987–2002), book 5, 62-63.
Božo Repe, Rdeča Slovenija (Ljubljana: Sophia, 2003).
 

1912 births
1953 deaths
Politicians from Vienna
Yugoslav Partisans members
Slovenian atheists
Recipients of the Order of the People's Hero
Recipients of the Order of Kutuzov, 2nd class
League of Communists of Slovenia politicians
Prime Ministers of Slovenia
Slovenian socialists
Ethnic Slovene people
Recipients of the Order of the Hero of Socialist Labour